Acidovorax valerianellae is a Gram-negative bacterium.

References

External links
Type strain of Acidovorax valerianellae at BacDive -  the Bacterial Diversity Metadatabase

Comamonadaceae
Bacteria described in 2003